Klaus is a 2019 Spanish-American animated Christmas adventure comedy film written and directed by Sergio Pablos in his directorial debut, produced by his company Sergio Pablos Animation Studios and distributed by Netflix. Co-written by Zach Lewis and Jim Mahoney, and co-directed by Carlos Martinez Lopez, the traditionally animated film stars the voices of Jason Schwartzman, J.K. Simmons, Rashida Jones, Will Sasso, Neda Margrethe Labba, Sergio Pablos (in a dual role), Norm Macdonald (in his final film role released in his lifetime), and Joan Cusack. Serving as an alternate origin story of Santa Claus independent from the historical Saint Nicholas of Myra and using a fictional 19th-century setting, the plot revolves around a postman stationed in an island town to the Far North who befriends a reclusive toymaker (Klaus).

Klaus was released on 8 November 2019 and received critical acclaim for its animation, story, and vocal performances. It won seven awards at the 47th Annie Awards, including Best Animated Feature, and also won Best Animated Film at the 73rd British Academy Film Awards. The film was also nominated at the 92nd Academy Awards for Best Animated Feature, making it the first animated film from Netflix to be nominated for an Academy Award, as well as the first animated film from a streaming service to be nominated, alongside I Lost My Body (also Netflix), but lost to Toy Story 4, which also starred Cusack.

Plot

In 19th-century Norway, Jesper Johansen is the lazy, spoiled, self-centered son of the Royal Postmaster General who has enrolled Jesper into his postman training academy hoping that it will reform him. Jesper deliberately underperforms, forcing his father to finally send him to the distant, northern island town of Smeerensburg with the task of posting 6,000 letters within a year. If Jesper fails, he will be cut off from the family's fortune.

Upon arrival, it is explained to Jesper by sarcastic ferryman Mogens, and bitter teacher-turned-fishmonger Alva, that the town's two familial clans—the Ellingboes and the Krums—comprise nearly all of Smeerensburg's populace and are perpetually feuding, spending more time hating each other than writing letters.

While desperately searching for people to post letters, Jesper finds an isolated house far outside the town. There, he discovers a tall reclusive woodsman named Klaus who has a house filled with handmade toys. Terrified by Klaus' imposing appearance, Jesper flees and leaves behind a drawing he had found from one of Smeerensburg’s Krum children. Klaus forces Jesper to bring him to the house depicted in the drawing and then secretly deliver a toy to the boy inside, cheering him up.

Word of this event spreads to other children and they go to Jesper the next day, each believing they will receive a toy if they send Klaus a letter. Jesper capitalizes on the idea and asks Klaus if he can donate his toys; Klaus agrees provided they operate at night and Jesper continues to deliver the toys in secret. The Krum boy's toy leads him to play with an Ellingboe girl, much to their clans’ outrage. Family elders Tammy Krum and Aksel Ellingboe each explain and show their clans' histories of hatred with each other, which have gone on for a long time, and find out it was Jesper and Klaus who delivered the Krum boy the toy. Soon, more children begin writing letters to Klaus. When Jesper tells them Klaus only gives toys to good children and knows whenever any child misbehaves, the acts of kindness they perform gradually inspire the rest of the townsfolk to end their ancient dispute, and Alva to reopen her school to help the children learn to read and write so they can send letters.

Eventually, Jesper and Klaus begin running out of toys. With Jesper's deadline approaching, he tries persuading Klaus to make more toys in time for Christmas. Klaus initially refuses, but then works with Jesper to build a sled for a small girl named Márgu, who lives in an isolated settlement with her people. Klaus finally tells Jesper about his wife Lydia and explains he had made the toys to give to the future children the couple hoped to have, but they couldn't conceive and Lydia died from an illness. Klaus has slowly realized their work is spreading joy to the children and agrees to the Christmas plan with Márgu and the rest of her people arriving to help. As the town and his relationship with Alva flourish, Jesper finds himself wanting to stay in Smeerensburg.

Meanwhile, Aksel Ellingboe and Tammy Krum form a temporary truce, wanting to stop Jesper and Klaus so that the families can resume their traditional feud. They themselves post enough letters to meet well over Jesper's target and let his father know he posted fourteen-thousand letters. Jesper’s father arrives on Christmas Eve to congratulate his son, inadvertently revealing to Jesper's friends the selfish motives behind his deeds. Just before they leave town, Jesper's father notices his son's remorse, and after a private talk, he allows Jesper to stay. Jesper then tries to stop the elders and their angry mob from destroying the Christmas toys but apparently fails. However, Alva had already been informed of the plot by the town's children, and so she and Klaus had replaced the toys with decoys. During the chase for the toys, Mr. Ellingboe's daughter Magdalone and Mrs. Krum's son Olaf also fall in love.

Jesper is redeemed and Smeerensburg becomes a happy town, with the family elders being forced to end the feud due to the marriage of their children. Jesper marries Alva and raises two children, and he and Klaus continue to deliver presents in Smeerensburg and beyond for eleven years. Then on the twelfth year, Klaus follows a wisp of wind up a sunny hill and disappears, saying he is joining his departed wife. But although he is gone, Klaus lives on in Christmas stories and so every subsequent Christmas Eve, Jesper still waits for Klaus who returns every year to deliver toys across the world.

Voice cast
 Jason Schwartzman as Jesper Johansen, a postman who befriends Klaus and helps bring much-needed happiness to Smeerensburg while getting accustomed to a life outside of his comfort zone.
 J. K. Simmons as Klaus (Santa Claus), an initially-reclusive large woodworker who makes toys.
 Simmons also provides the uncredited voice of the Drill Sarge, the assistant head of the Johansen family's postal department who works under the Royal Postmaster General. 
 Rashida Jones as Alva, a teacher turned fishmonger who becomes Jesper's love interest.
 Will Sasso as Mr. Aksel Ellingboe, the Ellingboe Clan patriarch carrying on an ancient feud of his clan with the Krums.
 Neda Margrethe Labba as Márgu, a young Sámi girl who becomes well acquainted with Jesper, despite their language barrier.
 Sergio Pablos as:
 Olaf Krum, Mrs. Krum's imposing son who does not speak, but communicates using inhuman sounds.
 Pumpkin Ellingboe, Mr. Ellingboe's pampered and imposing daughter whose only word is "mine", except when she says "Right" when Mr. Aksel Ellingboe plots to have Jesper and Klaus eliminated.
 Norm Macdonald as Mogens, the sarcastic ferryman of Smeerensburg who enjoys humor that comes at others' expense.
 Joan Cusack as Mrs. Tammy Krum, the Krum Clan matriarch carrying on an ancient feud of her clan with the Ellingboes.
 Reiulf Aleksandersen and Sara Margrethe Oksal as adult Sami voices.
 Sam McMurray as The Postmaster General (uncredited), Jesper's father and the headmaster of The Royal Post Academy who sends Jesper to Smeerensburg.

Additional children voices provided by Evan Agos, Sky Alexis, Jaeden Bettencourt, Teddy Blum, Mila Brener, Sydney Brower, Finn Carr, Kendall Joy Hall, Hayley Hermida, Lexie Holland, Brooke Huckeba, Matthew McCann, Tucker Meek, Leo Miller, Joaquin Obradors, Víctor Pablos, Lucian Perez, Bailey Rae Fenderson, Maximus Riegel, Emma Shannon, Ayden Soria, Sunday Sturz, Hudson West, Gordon Wilcox, Emma Yarovinskiy, and Julian Zane.

Additional adult voices provided by Brad Abrell, Catherine Cavadini, Bill Chott, Daniel Crook, Brian Finney, Stephen Hughes, Neil Kaplan, Sam McMurray, Amanda Philipson, Alyson Reed, Dee Dee Rescher, Dwight Schultz, Lloyd Sherr, Helen Slayton-Hughes, and Travis Willingham.

Production
After setting up his own animation studio in Madrid, Spain, director Sergio Pablos, who had worked on Disney Renaissance films such as The Hunchback of Notre Dame, Hercules, and Tarzan, decided to develop a new traditionally-animated feature film. Pablos wanted to explore how the medium would have evolved had western animation film studios not switched to producing mostly computer animated films since the 1990s. For the film's look, the studio sought to overcome some of the technical limitations that traditional animation had, focusing on organic and volumetric lighting and texturing to give the film a unique look, while maintaining a hand-crafted feel. Proprietary tools from Les films du Poisson Rouge, a French company in Angoulême, were used to allow the team to produce a variety of visual development styles, with the aim of getting away from the standardized style of "characters looking like stickers put on painted backgrounds."  Fellow Disney animator James Baxter, known for Beauty and the Beast, also worked on the film.

The first teaser for the project was released in April 2012; at the time, the studio was seeking investment, co-production, and distribution partners. It was shopped around to various studios, but most studios rejected the movie viewing it as "too risky." In November 2017, Netflix announced that they had acquired the global rights to Klaus; at the same time, the casting of Schwartzman, Jones, Simmons, and Cusack was announced along with a Christmas 2019 release date. In March 2019, it was reported that Netflix was planning an Oscar-qualifying run for Klaus in theaters, and it was listed as one of ten films Netflix was negotiating with chains to give limited releases prior to their online debuts that August. The film's release date was announced, alongside the debut of an official trailer, on 7 October.

The film is dedicated to animator and scene checker Mary Lescher who died on 2 June 2019 of cancer. She had worked on Klaus, as well as other animated features such as Beauty and the Beast and The Lion King. Pablos said Smeerensburg is a deliberate misspelling of Smeerenburg, a former Dutch and Norwegian whaling station in the Arctic archipelago of Svalbard.

Release
Klaus was released theatrically in select theaters on 8 November 2019, and was released digitally through Netflix on 15 November. It is the first original animated feature film to appear on Netflix. In January 2020, Netflix reported the film was watched by 40 million members over its first four weeks of release.

Reception

Critical response
The critical consensus reads "Beautiful hand-drawn animation and a humorous, heartwarming narrative make Klaus an instant candidate for holiday classic status." On Metacritic the film has a weighted average score of 65 out of 100, based on 13 critics, indicating "generally favorable reviews".

John DeFore of The Hollywood Reporter gave the film a positive review, writing: "Sergio Pablos' Klaus invents its own unexpected and very enjoyable origin story for the big guy who gives out toys every Christmas eve. Shaking off most Yuletide cliches in favor of a from-scratch story about how even dubiously-motivated generosity can lead to joy, it contains echoes of other seasonal favorites (especially, in a topsy-turvy way, Dr. Seuss' Grinch) while standing completely on its own."
Peter Debruge of Variety gave the film a mixed review, calling the film over-complicated and saying: "What goodwill the movie does inspire owes more to the splendid visual world than to anything the story supplies."

According to data provided by Netflix to Reuters, the film racked up nearly 30 million views worldwide in its first month. The film beat Toy Story 4 for best Animated Film of 2019 on Animation Magazine.

Accolades

Soundtrack
"Invisible" by Zara Larsson and "How You Like Me Now?" by The Heavy are featured in the film. The song "High Hopes" by Panic! at the Disco is featured in the trailer.

See also

 List of Christmas films
 Santa Claus in film

References

External links
 
 
 
 

2019 films
2019 animated films
2019 fantasy films
2010s adventure comedy films
2019 directorial debut films
2010s children's animated films
Animated Christmas films
Annie Award winners
Best Animated Feature Annie Award winners
Best Animated Feature BAFTA winners
Animated feature films
2010s Christmas comedy films
2010s Christmas films
English-language Spanish films
Films set in the Arctic
Films set in the 19th century
Netflix Animation films
Santa Claus in film
Spanish animated films
Spanish children's films
Spanish Christmas films
Spanish fantasy adventure films
Spanish fantasy comedy films
Spanish adventure comedy films
American adventure comedy films
American fantasy adventure films
American fantasy comedy films
American children's animated adventure films
American children's animated comedy films
American children's animated fantasy films
American Christmas films
Films set in Norway
2010s English-language films
2010s American films
2010s Spanish films